Comin' Round The Mountain is a 1951 film starring the comedy team of Abbott and Costello. It is a "hillbilly" comedy in the vein of Universal's successful Ma and Pa Kettle series. Charles Lamont had directed the first two Kettle films previously and would ultimately do five.

Plot
Theatrical agent Al Stewart has booked his client, Dorothy McCoy, "The Manhattan Hillbilly", at a New York nightclub. He has also booked an inept escape artist, The Great Wilbert, at the same location. During his performance, Wilbert cannot escape from his shackles and screams for help. Dorothy recognizes Wilbert's shrill scream as the "McCoy clan yell". More evidence of Wilbert's heritage, namely a photograph and concertina, are found in his dressing room, and prove that he is the long-lost grandson of "Squeeze Box" McCoy, leader of the McCoy clan. Granny McCoy has been looking for Wilbert, as she will reveal where Squeeze Box hid his gold to "kinfolk" only. Al, Dorothy and Wilbert head to Kentucky, and Granny recounts the story of the McCoy-Winfield feud that began over 60 years ago. The McCoys choose Wilbert to represent them against Devil Dan Winfield in a turkey shoot. Wilbert has never even seen a gun before, and his carelessness leads to a revival of the feud.

Granny informs Wilbert that even though he is Squeeze Box's kin, he must get married before the location of the gold can be revealed. Kalem, long the head of the clan, declares Wilbert should marry his 14-year-old daughter Clora (called Matt). Wilbert proposes to Dorothy, who declines because she is in love with Clark Winfield. Granny sends Wilbert to Aunt Huddy, the local witch, to obtain a love potion to use on Dorothy. While obtaining the potion, Huddy and Wilbert make voodoo dolls of each other and proceed to stick pins in them, which inflicts pain in the other person. After finally obtaining the potion, Wilbert gets on Huddy's broom (complete with windshield and wipers), flies through the door and crashes into a tree.

The potion initially works well, as Dorothy does fall for Wilbert, but then everyone gets a sip of the concoction and falls in love. The potion's effects eventually fade, and Clark and Dorothy prepare to marry. The Winfield clan soon arrives ready for a fight, during which a stray bullet breaks the love potion jar, leading Devil Dan to taste it and fall for Wilbert. Matt reveals the secret to the treasure: a map hidden in Wilbert's concertina, that leads to a mine in Winfield territory. Devil Dan helps them enter the mine, where they eventually break through the rock, finding themselves in a vault filled with gold. Armed guards arrive to arrest the hapless treasure seekers, who have just broken into the United States Bullion Depository at Fort Knox.

Cast
Bud Abbott as Al Stewart
Lou Costello as Wilbert Smith
Dorothy Shay as Dorothy McCoy
Kirby Grant as Clark Winfield
Joe Sawyer	as Kalem McCoy
Glenn Strange as Devil Dan Winfield
Ida Moore as Granny McCoy
Shaye Cogan as	Clora McCoy (Matt)
Margaret Hamilton as Aunt Huddy
Guy Wilkerson as Uncle Clem McCoy

Production
Comin' Round the Mountain was filmed from January 15 through February 12, 1951 and shot almost entirely in sequence.

Home media
This film has been released twice on DVD.  The first time, on The Best of Abbott and Costello Volume Three, on August 3, 2004, and again on October 28, 2008 as part of Abbott and Costello: The Complete Universal Pictures Collection.

References

External links

1951 films
1951 comedy films
American black-and-white films
American comedy films
Abbott and Costello films
Films directed by Charles Lamont
Universal Pictures films
1950s English-language films
1950s American films